Leaf Hound is an English hard rock band that formed from blues rock band Black Cat Bones in 1970. Leaf Hound is often cited as pioneers of heavy metal, hard rock, psychedelic rock and stoner rock. Their 1971 debut album Growers of Mushrooms is said to be a mixture of heavy metal, hard rock, psychedelic rock and stoner rock, and influenced those genres.

Biography
Leaf Hound was established from a reformed line-up of blues rock band Black Cat Bones, who had released their only album, Barbed Wire Sandwich, in February 1970. The British blues boom was fading by 1970 and the album had not sold well. Their vocalist left shortly after the release, and was replaced by Peter French. Guitarist Rod Price departed soon after to join Foghat, and French added his cousin Mick Halls on guitar. Keith George Young joined on drums. Soon afterwards, French changed the band's name to Leaf Hound, from a Ray Bradbury horror story titled "The Emissary", about a dog that returned from the dead covered in leaves. At this point the band consisted of French on vocals, Halls on lead guitar, brothers Derek Brooks and Stuart Brooks on rhythm guitar and bass respectively, and Young on drums.

They recorded Growers of Mushroom at Spot Studios in Mayfair, London, in late 1970. Soon after, Halls told French that they did not need rhythm guitarist Derek Brooks any more, as Halls could do all the guitar playing, so they asked him to leave the band. His brother Stuart soon left as well, and was replaced by Ron Thomas on bass. The band toured Europe as a four-piece and released the "Drowned My Life in Fear" single and the Leaf Hound album in Germany on Telefunken. The Growers of Mushroom album was released shortly after (featuring all of the tracks on the self-titled album) but by this time French had already departed to join Atomic Rooster for their album In Hearing Of. French would also later join to write and record on Atlantic Records the 'Ot 'n' Sweaty album with American hard rock band Cactus. Growers of Mushroom became a collectors item in the years to come and was voted the number one most collectable rock album in Q magazine.

In 2004 Peter French put together a new incarnation of the band with Luke Rayner on guitar. In 2006 they released a limited 7" on Rise Above Records featuring a live version of "Freelance Fiend" recorded in Soho, London, in September 2005. The b-side is taken from the same recording. In 2007 Leaf Hound released 'Unleashed' on 'Rare Recording'. According to the band's website, a live album is set for future release.
Leaf Hound released a live album recorded while they were in concert in Tokyo in 2012 titled Leaf Hound Live in Japan. This was released as a special limited 500-only package consisting of a green-coloured vinyl, CD, and DVD and a hand-printed poster album cover.
The LP was later released in 2013 featuring a different album cover design on Ripple Music released on either black vinyl, or a CD/DVD package; there was also a very limited distribution issued of the vinyl in a yellow-and-black mottled design.

Unleashed (2007–present)
The band reunited in 2004 to record and release their second studio album Unleashed on 12 November 2007, thirty six years after their debut. The line-up was different than that of their classic line-up of 1971. It features eight new compositions and a reworking of Atomic Rooster's "Breakthrough". The album met with critical acclaim from the music press with Kerrang! calling it, "As good a rock album as you could hope to hear." Classic Rock magazine noted, "An unpretentious hard rock record, relying on strong songs and powerful performances." French and Rayner were also praised for their production skills, "Preserving the Classic Rock sound."

Notes
Stuart Brooks now lives in the Los Angeles area. He was a member of Wishing Well, a power trio led by guitarist/vocalist Greg Leon, who issued their eponymous 1997 debut album on Tokuma Communications in Japan and on their own label stateside.

Wolfmother and Tame Impala have listed the group as an influence.

Members
Current line-up
 Peter French – vocals
 Tom Smith – guitar
 Pete Herbert – bass
 Dominic French – drums

Classic line-up
 Peter French – vocals
 Mick Halls – lead guitar
 Derek Brooks – rhythm guitar
 Stuart Brooks – bass
 Keith George Young – drums

Discography
 Leaf Hound LP (1970 Telefunken)
 Growers of Mushroom LP (1971 Decca Records) – same as Leaf Hound, but with additional tracks
 Unleashed CD (2007 R.A.R.E. Records)
 Live in Japan CD/DVD (2014 Ripple Music)

References

External links 
 Leaf Hound

English hard rock musical groups
English psychedelic rock music groups